Engkilili is a town in Lubok Antu District, Sri Aman Division, Sarawak, Malaysia. Neighbouring settlements include:

Education

Primary school
 Sekolah Kebangsaan Stengin/Sedarat
 Sekolah Kebangsaan Ng Menjuau
 Sekolah Kebangsaan Engkilili No 1

Secondary school
 Sekolah Menengah Kebangsaan Engkilili

References

Lubok Antu District
Towns in Sarawak